Kellem or Kellems is a surname. Notable people with the surname include:

Jeremy Kellem (born 1989), American football player
Vivien Kellems (1896-1975), American inventor